Ralph Royes (17 May 1908 – 13 December 1972) was a Jamaican cricketer. He played in one first-class match for the Jamaican cricket team in 1931/32.

See also
 List of Jamaican representative cricketers

References

External links
 

1908 births
1972 deaths
Jamaican cricketers
Jamaica cricketers
Sportspeople from Kingston, Jamaica